Scott Gordon may refer to:

 Scott Gordon (ice hockey) (born 1963), American ice hockey coach and former goaltender
 Scott Gordon (Canadian football) (born 1977), former Canadian football safety
 Scott Gordon (golfer) (born 1981), American golfer
 Scott Gordon (soccer) (born 1988), American soccer player
 Scott A. Gordon (born 1967), former president of Stephen F. Austin State University
 H. Scott Gordon (1924–2019), Canadian economist

See also
Gordon Scott (disambiguation)

.